Chico is a post-bop jazz lp by Chico Freeman on India Navigation Records IN 1031 -on which Chico switches between tenor saxophone, bass clarinet and flute during long, explorative tracks.

The LP consists of compositions by Mr. Freeman and his frequent bassist, Cecil McBee. All of side 2 was recorded in concert in New York City.

Criticism 
Jazz critic Scott Yanow wrote: “Freeman shows why he was rated so high during this early productive period.”

Background 
The album is part of the AACM American experimental music group movement, whose motto is "Great Black Music, Ancient to the Future."

Track listing 
 "Moments" (Freeman, McBee) – 16:31
 a) Generation
 b) Regeneration
 "And All The World Moved…" (Freeman, McBee) – 9:05
 "Merger" (Freeman)– 16:05

Reissues
An audio cd of this record was released in 1992 and again in 2000 by India Navigation, with the 24-minute, three-part "Moments" expanded by 7:23 for the reissue.

Personnel
 Chico Freeman -  tenor saxophone, flute, bass clarinet
 Cecil McBee – bass
 Muhal Richard Abrams – piano
 Steve McCall - drums
 Tito Sampa - percussion

Production
 India Navigation Company
 Cover art: James Russell

References

Chico Freeman albums
1977 live albums
India Navigation live albums